There are two current and one former royal offices in the United Kingdom of Lord High Constable:

 The Lord High Constable of England, the seventh of the Great Officers of State, ranking beneath the Lord Great Chamberlain and above the Earl Marshal
 The Lord High Constable of Scotland, a hereditary, now ceremonial, office of Scotland
 The Lord High Constable of Ireland, office abolished after the creation of the Irish Free State in 1922
 Sweden's riksmarsk is commonly rendered as Lord High Constable of Sweden in English